The Lincolnshire Co-operative Challenge was an English joint competition run by Lincolnshire Co-operative and the Lincolnshire & Rutland Education Business Partnership to promote fairtrade and enterprise within schools. The competition was open to schools in Lincolnshire, North Nottinghamshire and Rutland.

The first and second rounds of the competition took place within the participating schools where finalists were selected to go to the final which took place at the Jackson Theatre, University of Lincoln.  The prizes varied between years and were donated by the competition sponsors which include the Lincolnshire Co-operative, Starbucks, The Body Shop and from 2007 Marks & Spencer.

Winners 
2005 Friday 10 June

2006 Friday 9 June

2007 Friday 8 June

2008 Friday 6 June

2009 Friday 12 June

Number of times in the Top 3 

Note: There was no Top 3 in 2005

External links 
 2005 Co Operative Challenge
 2006 Co Operative Challenge
 2007 Co Operative Challenge

Education in Lincolnshire